The Obispo Street is one of the most famous and traveled streets of Old Havana. During its history it has received several names such as: San Juan, Bishop (Obispo), Weyler, Pi Margall, among others, for a total of 47. It is the longest Street in Old Havana. Street shops have always been abundant alongside O'Reilly Street, which is parallel to it from its inception from Zulueta to Havana Bay.

Places of interest 
 Palace of the Captains-General
 Plaza de Armas
 National Museum of Natural History of Cuba
 Obispo 463, Sastrería
 Bar "El Floridita"
 Numismatic Museum
 Bookstore "Fayad Jamís"
 House of "Mayorazgo Recio"
 Bookstore La Moderna Poesía
 Ministry of Finance and Price
 Library "Rubén Martínez Villena"
 The house of water "La Tinaja"
 San Jerónimo University
 Cuban Book Institute

References

Streets in Havana
Buildings and structures in Havana
Waterfronts
Tourist attractions in Havana